The season of 1899–1900 in Scottish football was the 27th season of competitive football in Scotland and the tenth season of the Scottish Football League.

League competitions

Scottish Division One 

Rangers were champions of the Scottish Division One.

Scottish Division Two 

Partick Thistle won the Scottish Division Two.

Other honours

Cup honours

National

County

Non-league honours

Senior 

Highland League

Other Leagues

Scotland national team

Scotland were winners of the 1900 British Home Championship, having won all three of their matches.

Key:
 (H) = Home match
 (A) = Away match
 BHC = British Home Championship

Other national teams

Scottish League XI

See also
1899–1900 Rangers F.C. season

Notes

References

External links
Scottish Football Historical Archive

 
Seasons in Scottish football